WNKR (106.7 FM) is a commercial radio station licensed to Williamstown, Kentucky and serving the Cincinnati metropolitan area.  Until July 12, 2022, it simulcast a classic country radio format with sister station 105.9 WNKN.  WNKR's call sign stands for Northern Kentucky Radio.  It has been owned since its inception in 1992 by Grant County Broadcasters, Inc., an independent and local broadcasting company.

WNKR has an effective radiated power (ERP) of 1,800 watts.  The transmitter is off U.S. Route 25 in Dry Ridge, Kentucky.

History
On April 1, 1992, WNKR first signed on.  Originally licensed on 106.5, in 2008, WNKR completed a signal upgrade, which included moving to 106.7 FM. Programming on WNKR is a locally produced playlist of Classic Country music from the 1970s, 80s and 90s, hosted by local air personalities. Local and Kentucky News Network news coverage are combined with local traffic and weather to create full-service programming in AM and PM drive times. Special programming on the station consists of University of Kentucky Wildcats play-by-play sports and Rick Jackson's syndicated Country Classics program Saturday nights and Sunday mornings.

For listeners located outside the range of its terrestrial signal, WNKR streams all of its program content including play-by-play Wildcats sports broadcasts on the Internet.

On October 2, 2017, 105.9 WNKN, licensed to Middletown, Ohio, was purchased by Grant County Broadcasters from Northern Kentucky University.  It began broadcasting as a sister station to WNKR. This returns WNKN to the classic country format that was played on the station prior to its purchase by NKU in 2011 and extends WNKR's overall broadcast reach north to the Dayton metropolitan area. Both stations are branded as "Classic Country 105.9 & 106.7".

On July 12, 2022, Grant County Broadcasters broke the simulcast and flipped WNKN to classic hits, as "105.9 The Oasis".

References

External links

NKR
1992 establishments in Kentucky